Thomas James Walsh (August 10, 1875 – July 11, 1915) was a politician in Alberta, Canada.  He served as alderman on the Edmonton City Council from 1912 until 1913.

A native of what would later become Ontario, Walsh was an educator upon his arrival in the Edmonton/Strathcona area around 1898. Later serving as a customs officer and real estate man, Walsh would become a prominent voice in advocating for the amalgamation of Edmonton and Strathcona (then two separate cities) in the early 1910s. When the amalgamation was later passed, Walsh ran for city council and would be elected, serving out one term. He died in 1915.

Early life and career
Walsh was born in 1875 at Keene, Canada West (later Ontario), a son of Timothy and Catherine (née Buck) Walsh. His father was a farmer in the Otonabee Township area. Thomas Walsh attended schooling in Norwood, Ontario, and later moved to Alberta in 1898, becoming a teacher. After arriving, he first taught at Camilla School, near Rivière Qui Barre, Sturgeon County. He returned briefly to Ontario in 1902 to wed Maude Clara Bell, a former classmate in high school. Returning to Alberta, he resumed teaching, this time at another school north of the town of Edmonton, then at Strathcona. He was also at a time the first principal of St. Anthony's, the city's separate (Roman Catholic) school. In 1907 he became a customs officer at Strathcona, serving in that capacity until 1911, when he entered the real estate profession. In the real estate field, he was known for building the Commercial Hotel, located on Whyte Avenue, in 1912, a structure that still stands presently. Walsh was a member of the Strathcona Hospital Board as well as a devout Roman Catholic, attending St. Anthony's Roman Catholic Church. He was also active in the Catholic Mutual Benefit Association, serving as an organizer and as the first president of that group at his church. Walsh was also a member of Strathcona's curling club.

Political activities

Active in municipal affairs of Strathcona, Walsh a leader in a group of residents that lobbied for the amalgamation of Strathcona with the city of Edmonton, which was situated north of the North Saskatchewan River. When the amalgamation was to take place in February 1912, Walsh was urged by friends to run for alderman in the upcoming election, and decided to stand. He would run campaign advertisements in the Edmonton Bulletin, noting his involvement with the amalgamation negotiations of the two cities, stating that he "was one worked strenuously and conscientsciously for it until its final consummation". He would choose to run without a platform, stating "I prefer not to make any pre-election promises or to attempt now to formulate a civic policy, as undoubtedly the best civic policy will be ultimately be evolved by the mayor and council acting together on suggestions probably to come from you, the electors."

He was elected to Edmonton City Council in the February 1912 municipal election, finishing eighth of eighteen candidates.  As the top five finishers in the election were expected to be elected to two-year terms, with the next five being elected to one-year terms; this would normally have resulted in Walsh being required to seek re-election in the next election.  However, the terms of the amalgamation between Edmonton and Strathcona, which had been effected days before the election (with Walsh's support), required that two of the five councillors elected to two-year terms come from the south side of the North Saskatchewan River, which Walsh, unlike six of the candidates to finish ahead of him, did; accordingly, he was elected to a two-year term, while fifth-place finisher James East received only one year. The other south side aldermen elected in the election would be John G. Tipton and Hugh Calder.

During his brief aldermanic term, among offering his opinion many issues, Walsh opposed proposed increases to salaries of city employees, and  supported a proposal to extend the street railway system. Council this term also saw the proposal of the Pelican Oil and Gas Company to gain a contract to supply their product to the city; Walsh offered the view that it was ultimately up to the citizens to decide whether to grant the contract. He also sat briefly on the council's parks committee. He served out his term and offered for election again in 1913, however it is unclear if he would withdraw or be defeated for re-election as names of defeated candidates are no longer available.

Death and funeral
Walsh died in the morning of July 11, 1915 after suffering a stroke of paralysis one week previous, having been unconscious for a week.  He was survived by his wife, Clara and their two children, Thomas and Clara, aged 12 and 10 respectively at the time. Other survivors included his father as well as eight siblings, four brothers and four sisters. After his funeral, which was held at St. Anthony's Church and attended by former mayor William Short, former mayor of Strathcona John J. Duggan, Walsh's city council colleagues whom he served with, as well as representatives from the Knights of Columbus and Catholic Mutual Benefit Association; he was buried at the St. Anthony's Church Cemetery.

References

1945 deaths
Edmonton city councillors
Canadian schoolteachers
Canadian hoteliers
1875 births